Kazımkarabekir is a town and district of Karaman Province in the Central Anatolia region of Turkey. According to 2000 census, population of the district is 5,442 of which 3,634 live in the town of Kazımkarabekir.

Notes

References

External links
 District governor's official website 

Populated places in Karaman Province
Districts of Karaman Province